The Deportivo CAFESSA, commonly known as CAFESSA or CAFESSA Tlajomulco, is a Mexican football club based in Guadalajara. The club was founded in 2015, and currently plays in the Liga TDP. Previously, the club maintained another Liga TDP team at Tonalá, Jalisco, in addition, another squad that played in the Liga Premier – Serie B

In June 2019, Deportivo CAFESSA Jalisco was created, before, CAFESSA Tlajomulco served as the main team of the franchise. Subsequently, after the creation of CAFESSA Jalisco, it became the main reserve team of the club, although maintaining its own identity with respect to Jalisco.

Players

Current squad

See also 
 Deportivo CAFESSA Jalisco

References 

Association football clubs established in 2015
Football clubs in Jalisco
2015 establishments in Mexico
Liga Premier de México